The final of the 2008-II Copa Mustang was played between Independiente Medellín and América de Cali. The first leg match was won by América de Cali by an early goal in the second half. At the second leg match, América de Cali were crowned champions of the 2008-II Copa Mustang championship, giving them the chance to participate in the Copa Libertadores 2009 (same way to Independiente Medellín and giving them the championship for the thirteenth time in their history.

Matches

First leg match

Second leg match

References

América de Cali matches
Independiente Medellín